Iran Shahi (also Romanized as Īrān Shāhī; also known as Īrānshāh and Īrānshahr) is a village in Khaveh-ye Shomali Rural District, in the Central District of Delfan County, Lorestan Province, Iran. At the 2006 census, its population was 1,416, in 337 families.

References 

Towns and villages in Delfan County